Lake Be Malae, also spelt Bemalae, is a  lagoon in the district of Bobonaro on the north-west coast of East Timor, a country occupying the eastern end of the island of Timor in the Lesser Sunda Islands of Wallacea.

Description
The lake is a broad and shallow expanse of saline water and mudflats which sometimes largely dries up. Its margins are vegetated by mangroves and dry forest. Its outlet is a winding, mangrove-lined channel leading to the sea.

Birds
The lake and its surrounds have been identified by BirdLife International as a 28,000 ha Important Bird Area because they support populations of bar-necked cuckoo-doves, pink-headed imperial pigeons, jonquil parrots, streak-breasted honeyeaters, plain gerygones, fawn-breasted whistlers, green figbirds, olive-brown orioles, buff-banded thicketbirds, white-bellied bush chats and flame-breasted sunbirds.

See also
 List of Important Bird Areas in East Timor

References

Bodies of water of East Timor
Important Bird Areas of East Timor
Bobonaro Municipality
Lagoons of Asia